Ndong Awing, or Ndong Awing Cultural & Development Association, is an association created on 23 December 1962 for the purpose of furthering the development of the Awing village and Fondom in the Northwest Region of Cameroon.

Geographical location

The village of Awing is located about 21 km (13 miles) south of the town of Bamenda. The area between longitude 10°10’E – 10°22’E of GMT and latitude 5°49’N – 6°00’N of the Equator comprises the Fondom of Awing. To the northwest of Awing is what used to be the Bafut-Ngemba Native Authority Forest Reserve (today called Government Forest Reserve), Lake Awing (a crater lake and shrine), Mt. Lefo (which is the 4th highest mountain in the country - 2,550m (8,366.1 ft) and Akum. In the north, Awing shares boundaries with Mendankwe, Bambili, and Babanki Tungoh. Awing shares boundaries in the northeast with Balikumbat, to the east with Bamukumbit, to the southeast by Bamenyam, to the south by Baligham (also called Bali-Bagam), and to the west by Njong.

References

External links 
 Ndong Awing website

Northwest Region (Cameroon)